Sleepers East is a 1934 American crime film directed by Kenneth MacKenna and written by Lester Cole. It is based on the 1933 novel Sleepers East by Frederick Nebel. The film stars Wynne Gibson, Preston Foster, Mona Barrie, Harvey Stephens, Roger Imhof and J. Carrol Naish. The film was released on January 26, 1934, by Fox Film Corporation.

Plot

Cast    
Wynne Gibson as Lena Karelson
Preston Foster as Jason Everett
Mona Barrie as Ada Robillard
Harvey Stephens as Martin Knox
Roger Imhof as MacGowan
J. Carrol Naish as Carl Izzard
Suzanne Kaaren as Dixie
Howard Lally as Jack Wentworth

References

External links
 

1934 films
American crime films
1934 crime films
Fox Film films
Films directed by Kenneth MacKenna
American black-and-white films
1930s English-language films
1930s American films